Nowy Bukowiec  is a village in the administrative district of Gmina Stara Kiszewa, within Kościerzyna County, Pomeranian Voivodeship, in northern Poland.

The village has a population of 72.

See also
History of Pomerania''

References

Villages in Kościerzyna County